Allyl mercaptan (AM) is a small molecule allyl derivative and an organosulfur compound derived from garlic and a few other genus Allium plants.   Its formula is C3H6S.  It has been shown to be the most effective HDAC inhibitor of known garlic-derived organosulfur compounds and their metabolites.

References 

Thiols
Histone deacetylase inhibitors
Allyl compounds
Foul-smelling chemicals